The Satellite Award for Best Miniseries or Television Film was one of the annual Satellite Awards given by the International Press Academy.

The IPA separated these two categories from 1999 to 2010 and 2014 to 2015 as Best Miniseries and Best Television Film, respectively. While the awards would merge again for a third time in 2016, they would split again from 2017 onward.

Winners and nominees

1990s

2010s

References

Miniseries or Television Film